"Coffee" (also titled "Coffee (Fucking)") is a song by American singer Miguel, featuring vocals from fellow American rapper Wale, taken from his third studio album Wildheart (2015). It was released on May 4, 2015 by ByStorm Entertainment and RCA Records as the album's lead single from the album.

Background
The song was leaked online in December 2014, and it was featured on his mixtape Wild.

Critical reception
"Coffee" received critical acclaim from music critics. The song was chosen upon release as Pitchfork Media's "Best New Track". Meaghan Garvey stated that "in an age where our R&B heroes proclaim their lack of emotions a little too loudly, "Coffee" presents intimacy as infinitely bad-ass: A cold flame, the thrill of no shame." Rolling Stone ranked "Coffee" at number 27 on its year-end list to find the 50 best songs of 2015.

Music video

A music video for the song was released on June 16, 2015. The original version was used to make the video instead of the extended version.

Track listings
Digital download
 "Coffee" - 4:50

Digital download (Extended version)
 "Coffee (Fucking)" (featuring Wale) - 5:14

Charts

Certifications

References

2014 songs
RCA Records singles
Miguel (singer) songs
2015 singles
Songs written by Miguel (singer)
Songs written by Wale (rapper)
Wale (rapper) songs